Acacia imparilis is a shrub belonging to the genus Acacia and the subgenus Phyllodineae that is endemic to south western Australia.

Description
Like most species of Acacia it has phyllodes rather than true leaves. The evergreen, ascending to erect phyllodes have an inequilaterally narrowly oblong to obovate or oblanceolate shape and are usually shallowly sigmoid. It produces cream-yellow flowers in October.

Distribution
It is native to an area in the Great Southern region of Western Australia from around Cranbrook to Mount Barker where it is commonly situated on rocky hills at the very western end of the Stirling Range in open mallee scrub communities.

See also
List of Acacia species

References

imparilis
Acacias of Western Australia
Taxa named by Bruce Maslin
Plants described in 1999